Terence Weber (born 24 September 1996) is a German nordic combined skier.

He participated at the FIS Nordic World Ski Championships 2019.

World Championship

World Cup

Standings

Individual victories

References

External links

German male Nordic combined skiers
Living people
1996 births
FIS Nordic World Ski Championships medalists in Nordic combined